The Washerman is a 2018 Nigerian romantic comedy film produced by Etinosa Idemudia and directed by Charles Uwagbai. The movie stars Ik Ogbonna, Frank Donga, Mc Abbey, Bryan Okwara, Mofe Duncan, Judith Audu, Sound Sultan, Sexy Steel and Mercy Isoyip.

Synopsis 
The story revolves around a vlogger who is desperately in search of true love. With his prayers, he overcomes disappointments and found love, though it is not what was expected.

Cast 
Judith Audu, Stephen Damian, Sani Danja, Frank Donga, Etinosa Idemudia, Mercy Isoyip, Jaywon, IK Ogbonna, Chris Okagbue, Bryan Okwara, Genny Uzoma.

References 

2018 films
Nigerian romantic comedy films
2010s English-language films
2018 romantic comedy films
English-language Nigerian films